Charles DeWitt Bruyn (December 12, 1784 – February 9, 1849) was an American politician from Ulster County, New York.

Early life
Bruyn was born on December 12, 1784, in Shawangunk, Ulster County, New York. He was a son of Johannes Bruyn (1750–1814) and Margaret (née DeWitt) Bruyn (1758–1827).

His maternal grandparents were Blandina (née DuBois) DeWitt and Col. Charles DeWitt, who served as a delegate to the Continental Congress. Through his uncle Gerrit DeWitt and his wife, Catharine (née Ten Eyck) DeWitt, he was a first cousin of Charles G. DeWitt, a U.S. Representative who was appointed the U.S. Chargé d'Affaires to Guatemala by Andrew Jackson. His aunt, Maria "Polly" DeWitt, was the wife of Jacobus "James" Hasbrouck, a prominent Kingston merchant. His paternal grandparents were, and Jacobus Bruyn, who served as a member of the New York General Assembly from Ulster County from 1759 to 1768. He was also a nephew of Assemblyman Jacobus S. Bruyn, Severyn Tenhout Bruyn and Cornelius Bruyn. Through his uncle Jacobus, he was a first cousin of U.S. Representative Andrew DeWitt Bruyn.

Career
A farmer by occupation, "he was a man of good mind, and well read in the current topics of his time. He was a useful citizen, and engaged in general conveyancing and surveying, as his father had before him. He was influential and active in politics; as a member of the Whig party was appointed Sheriff of Ulster County in 1812, and again in 1815."

Bruyn was a Federalist/Clintonian member of New York State Assembly from Sullivan and Ulster counties from 1821 to 1822. He also served as postmaster.

Personal life
In 1816, Bruyn was married to his first cousin, Maria Hasbrouck (1793–1851), a daughter of James Hasbrouck and Polly (née DeWitt) Hasbrouck. Together, they were the parents of four children:

 Mary Bruyn (1818–1867)
 Johannes "John" Bruyn (1820–1862), a Yale educated lawyer who practiced in Kingston.
 Margaret Bruyn
 Charles DeWitt Bruyn (1834–1896), who was educated at the Kingston Academy and succeeded his uncle Cornelius as president of the State of New York Bank in 1873; he married Jessie Butters, a daughter of Archibald Butters of New York City.

Bruyn died on February 9, 1849, in Shawangunk and was buried at the Bruynswick Rural Cemetery in Bruynswick, New York.

References

External links

1784 births
1849 deaths
Members of the New York State Assembly
Burials in New York (state)
19th-century American politicians
De Witt family
Bruyn family